Tufi Airport is an airport in Tufi, Papua New Guinea built in the 1960s by the Australian Army.  It consists of a single  unpaved runway along a 059-239 degree axis.  There is no control tower and refueling is not available.  Air Niugini flights are typically scheduled on Monday (POM-PNP-TFI-POM) and Friday (POM-TFI-PNP-POM).  Tropic Air also schedules irregular cargo and passenger charter flights.

Airlines and destinations

References

External links
 

Airports in Papua New Guinea
Oro Province